La Presse was the first penny press newspaper in France.

Overview
La Presse was founded on 16 June 1836 by Émile de Girardin as a popular conservative enterprise. While contemporary newspapers depended heavily on subscription and tight party affiliation, La Presse was sold by street vendors. Girardin wanted the paper to support the government, without being so tied to specific cabinets that it would limit the newspaper's readership. The initial subscription to La Presse was only 40 francs a year while other newspapers charged around 80 francs.

La Presse and Le Siècle are considered the first titles of the industrialized press era in France.

See also
 History of French journalism

References

External links
La Presse digital archives from 1836 to 1935 in Gallica, the digital library of the BnF

1836 establishments in France
French penny papers
Presse (France), La
Publications established in 1836